Patrick Moerlen (born 15 February 1955) is a Swiss former professional racing cyclist. He rode in three editions of the Tour de France.

References

External links
 

1955 births
Living people
Swiss male cyclists
Sportspeople from the canton of Neuchâtel